Captain Sir Alexander Burnes  (16 May 1805 – 2 November 1841) was a Scottish explorer, military officer, and diplomat associated with the Great Game. He was nicknamed Bokhara Burnes for his role in establishing contact with and exploring Bukhara. His memoir, Travels into Bokhara, was a bestseller when it was first published in 1835.

Early life

Burnes was born on 16 May 1805 in Montrose, Scotland, as the fourth son of James Burnes (1780–1852) the local provost, who was first cousin to the poet Robert Burns. His brother was the doctor and surgeon James Burnes. 

At the age of sixteen, Alexander joined the army of the East India Company and while serving in India, he learned Urdu and Persian, and obtained an appointment as interpreter at Surat in 1822. 

He was transferred to Kutch in 1826 where he was based at Bhuj for three years. As assistant to the political agent, he took an interest in the history and geography of north-western India and the adjacent countries, which had not yet been thoroughly explored by the British; he then went to Afghanistan.

Exploration

Afghanistan, one of the most remote kingdoms in the world, found itself sandwiched between the rival British and Russian empires. British control in India made the Russians suspect an intention to move northwards through Afghanistan; conversely, the British feared that India was sought by Russia. Sensing the two empires would collide in Afghanistan, the British Government needed intelligence and dispatched Burnes to get it. In 1831, travelling in disguise, Burnes surveyed the route through Kabul to Bukhara and produced the first detailed accounts of Afghan politics.

His proposal in 1829 to undertake a journey of exploration through the valley of the Indus River was approved and in 1831 his and Henry Pottinger's surveys of the Indus river would prepare the way for a future assault on the Sindh to clear a path towards Central Asia.

In the same year he arrived in Lahore with a present of horses from King William IV to Maharaja Ranjit Singh.  The British claimed that the horses would not survive the overland journey, so they were allowed to transport the horses up the Indus and used the opportunity to secretly survey the river. Despite pressure from his superiors, Burnes declined a military escort on his journey up the Indus, fearing their presence would cause the native population to conclude the British intended to mount an invasion. Instead, Burnes travelled with only one other British officer, Ensign J.D. Leckie, and periodically enlisted members of native communities to man and navigate his convoy. In so doing, Burnes developed close bonds with local leaders and governors in cities along the Indus. His immense skills in diplomacy and knowledge of local customs and rites of flattery enabled him to travel through areas of the Indus previously closed to Europeans, including Thatta, Hyderabad, Bukkur, and Shujabad, among others.

In October 1831, Burnes coordinated the first meeting of Maharaja Ranjit Singh with a sitting commander of British forces in India, Governor General Lord William Bentinck. The assembly took place in the village of Rupur on the banks of the Sutlej from 22 to 26 October. The event was attended by numerous British political attachés and subalterns including Bentinck, General John Ramsay, and H.T. Prinsep. The event was also marked by the Maharajah's open display of the celebrated Koh-i-Noor diamond, which he presented for free inspection by the British attendees (the jewel would eventually come into the possession of the British Royal Family, and set in the Crown of Queen Alexandra).

Following the Rupur summit, Burnes took up brief residence in Delhi from November to December 1831. It was in Delhi that, on 19 December, Burnes first made contact with his future travelling partner Mohan Lal. While visiting a Hindu school in the grounds of Humayun's Tomb, Burnes witnessed a recitation by Lal on the dismemberment of Poland, and was so impressed with the young boy's knowledge of western geography, he invited Lal to travel with him to Tartary. From Delhi, Burnes then travelled to Ludhiana where he received permission to proceed in his travels into Central Asia.

In the following years, in company with Mohan Lal, his travels continued through Afghanistan across the Hindu Kush to Bukhara (in what is modern Uzbekistan) and Persia.

The narrative which he published on his visit to England in 1834 added immensely to contemporary knowledge of these countries, and was one of the most popular books of the time. It was republished in 2012. The first edition earned the author £800, and his services were recognised not only by the Royal Geographical Society of London, but also by that of Paris. He was also elected a Fellow of the Royal Society the same year. London's prestigious Athenaeum Club admitted him without ballot. Soon after his return to India in 1835 he was appointed to the court of Sindh to secure a treaty for the navigation of the Indus and in 1836 he undertook a political mission to Dost Mohammed Khan at Kabul.

First Anglo-Afghan War 
He advised Lord Auckland to support Dost Mohammed on the throne of Kabul, but the viceroy preferred to follow the opinion of Sir William Hay Macnaghten and reinstated Shah Shuja, thus leading to the outbreak of the First Anglo-Afghan War. On the restoration of Shah Shuja in 1839, Burnes became regular political agent at Kabul. He was knighted by Queen Victoria on 6 August 1838, while serving in the 21st India Native Infantry on a mission in Afghanistan, and remained there until his assassination in 1841, during an insurrection in which his younger brother, Charles, was also killed.  The calmness with which he continued at his post despite the threat to his life, and  after the death of his political assistant Major William Broadfoot, won him a heroic reputation.

It came to light in 1860 that some of Burnes' dispatches from Kabul in 1839 had been altered to convey opinions that had not been his, but Lord Palmerston refused after so long to grant the inquiry demanded in the House of Commons. An account of his later labours was published in 1842 under the title of Cabool: A Personal Narrative of a Journey to, and Residence in that City, in the Years 1836, 7, and 8.

Final months and death

On 7 August 1839, the British Government restored Afghan leader Shah Shuja to the throne in Kabul after an exile of over thirty years. Shujah, essentially a puppet for the British administration, had been living as a pensioner of the crown for the entirety of his exile and was considered to be the candidate most complacent and willing to cooperate with British interests in the region. 

Burnes, having long considered Shujah unfit to rule, had implored then Governor General Lord Auckland to endorse Dost Mohammad Khan to accede the throne. His recommendations went unheeded and, on 3 November 1840, Dost Mohammad surrendered himself to British forces, going into exile in India. Despite his hesitation in endorsing Shujah; Burnes, along with Sir William McNoughten, was installed in Kabul as resident political officers, a position Burnes himself resented, calling himself "a highly paid idler". 

In Kabul, the reign of Shah Shuja was marked by tyranny and widespread poverty among the Afghan people. Shuja announced that he considered his own people to be "dogs" who needed to be taught to be obedient to their master, and spent his time exacting bloody vengeance on those Afghans who he felt had betrayed him. 

At the same time, large numbers of British officers, their wives, children, and staff, had relocated to Kabul for the favourable temperatures, having previously been stationed in the hot, dry plains of Hindustan. The British influx brought with it a large number of alien customs such as cricket, skating, and steeplechase. The sudden swelling of the city's population caused prices for food and goods in the bazaars to skyrocket, at the same time as Shujah had greatly increased taxation on the population, leading to a large scale economic depression among the lower class.

At the urging of Shah Shuja, the British and Indian troops had agreed to relocate their encampment out of the city walls, setting up a series of cantonments outside the city. Burnes however, chose to remain within the heart of the old city, taking up residence in a walled house with a handful of other senior officers including his brother Lieutenant Charles Burnes, and Major William Broadfoot. 

On 1 November 1841, Burnes was approached by his former travelling companion Mohan Lal who informed Burnes of a plot to have him killed, urging him to flee the city for the relative safety of the cantonment. As the representative of Britain in Kabul, it was Burnes whom many Afghans considered responsible for the city's financial and religious decay. Confident he could quell any potential trouble, Burnes chose to stay in Kabul against his friend's advice. That night, a small group of men began driving up a mob around the city. The group, originally a small contingent directly opposed to Burnes's presence, managed to swell their numbers by spreading the message that the building adjacent to Burnes' house was used as the garrison treasury, holding pay for the entire British forces in Kabul.

By nightfall, a large mob had assembled within the courtyard of Burnes's house. Burnes sent a runner to the cantonments asking for immediate assistance, before stepping out onto his balcony to attempt to reason with the crowd. Reportedly, assistance from the British army was delayed by a series of internal arguments between senior officers there on how best to respond to the threat. 

The situation with the rioters continued to deteriorate as they set fire to the compound stables. A single shot was fired from the crowd and Major Broadfoot, standing beside Burnes on the balcony, was killed. Now assured that there was no longer a chance for rescue, Charles Burnes exited, armed, into the courtyard, reportedly killing six men before being hacked to death. Alexander Burnes was soon beaten and hacked to death by the mob. The events took place just half an hour's march from where the British troops had been stationed. One young officer, recording the event in his journal, noted "When 300 men would have been sufficient in the morning, 3000 would not have been adequate in the afternoon."

Legacy
He is commemorated in the name of the rufous-vented grass babbler Laticilla burnesii.

Publications

Historical fiction featuring Burnes
 Fraser, George MacDonald, Flashman. 1969.
 Hensher, Philip, The Mulberry Empire. 2002.
 Henty, G. A., To Herat and Cabul, A Story of the First Afghan War. 1902.
 Assassin's Creed Chronicles: India

References

Bibliography
 
 
 
 
 
 +

External links

 Freemasonry and the Leaders of Victorian Britain

British diplomats
Knights Bachelor
1805 births
1841 deaths
British people of the First Anglo-Afghan War
Explorers of Central Asia
Scottish explorers
British explorers
Great Game
Fellows of the Royal Society
British military personnel of the First Anglo-Afghan War
Assassinated British diplomats
People from Montrose, Angus
19th-century British diplomats
Scottish Freemasons
British people in colonial India
Recipients of the Royal Geographical Society Founder's Medal
Lynching deaths